The joule per mole (symbol: J·mol−1 or J/mol) is the unit of energy per amount of substance in the International System of Units (SI), such that energy is measured in joules, and the amount of substance is measured in moles. 

It is also an SI derived unit of molar thermodynamic energy defined as the energy equal to one joule in one mole of substance. For example, the Gibbs free energy of a compound in the area of thermochemistry is often quantified in units of kilojoules per mole (symbol: kJ·mol−1 or kJ/mol), with 1 kilojoule = 1000 joules. 

Physical quantities measured in J·mol−1 usually describe quantities of energy transferred during phase transformations or chemical reactions. Division by the number of moles facilitates comparison between processes involving different quantities of material and between similar processes involving different types of materials.  The precise meaning of such a quantity is dependent on the context (what substances are involved, circumstances, etc.), but the unit of measurement is used specifically to describe certain existing phenomena, such as in thermodynamics it is the unit of measurement that describes molar energy.

Since 1 mole = 6.02214076 particles (atoms, molecules, ions etc.), 1 joule per mole is equal to 1 joule divided by 6.02214076 particles, ≈1.660539 joule per particle. This very small amount of energy is often expressed in terms of an even smaller unit such as the kJ·mol−1, because of the typical order of magnitude for energy changes in chemical processes. For example, heats of fusion and vaporization are usually of the order of 10 kJ·mol−1, bond energies are of the order of 100 kJ·mol−1, and ionization energies of the order of 1000 kJ·mol−1. 

Other units sometimes used to describe reaction energetics are kilocalories per mole (kcal·mol−1), electron volts per particle (eV),  and wavenumbers in inverse centimeters (cm−1). 1 kJ·mol−1 is approximately equal to 1.04 eV per particle, 0.239 kcal·mol−1,  or 83.6 cm−1. At room temperature (25 °C, or 298.15 K) 1 kJ·mol−1 is approximately equal to 0.4034 .

References 

SI derived units